Charvat or Charvát (Czech feminine: Charvátová) is a Czech surname referring to a person of Croatian descent.  Notable people include:
 Antonín Charvát (1899–1930), Czech cyclist
 Gregory Charvat, American author
 Přemysl Charvát (1930–2005), Czech conductor
 Lucie Charvátová (born 1993), Czech biathlete
 Olga Charvátová, (born 1962), Czech alpine skier

See also
 

Czech-language surnames